Sidney Ernest Rowland Castle (12 March 1892 in Basingstoke – 27 January 1978) was an English professional footballer who played for Basingstoke Town, Thornycroft Athletic, Guildford United, Tottenham Hotspur, Charlton Athletic, Chelsea.

Football career 
After playing for Basingstoke Town, Thorneycrofts and Guildford United, the outside right joined Tottenham Hotspur. Between 1919 and 1920 Castle made five appearances for the Spurs. He signed for Charlton Athletic in 1921 and went on to play in 66 matches and scoring 10 goals. In 1923, Castle signed for Chelsea where he featured in a further 33 games and finding the net twice. He re-joined Guildford United where he ended his playing career.

Management career

He coached in the Netherlands at Ajax between early 1927 and September 1928 and two teams from Zwolle before coaching Heerenveen in two spells and FC Meppel.

References

1892 births
1978 deaths
Sportspeople from Basingstoke
English footballers
English Football League players
Basingstoke Town F.C. players
Thornycroft Athletic F.C. players
Guildford City F.C. players
Tottenham Hotspur F.C. players
Charlton Athletic F.C. players
Chelsea F.C. players
AFC Ajax managers
PEC Zwolle managers
SC Heerenveen managers
English football managers
English expatriate football managers
English expatriate sportspeople in the Netherlands
Expatriate football managers in the Netherlands
Association football outside forwards
Footballers from Hampshire